= Flexible tenancy =

Flexible tenancies also known as fixed term flexible tenancies or flexible council tenancies are a type of tenancy in the United Kingdom created by the Localism Act.
